The Kadem Project is a reservoir on the river Kadem, a tributary river of Godavari near Kademm Mandal, Nirmal District, Telangana. This project covers localised ayacut under Nirmal and Mancherial Districts.

The Project has been integrated with Sriram Sagar Project. The reservoir being supplemented through Sri Rama Sagar Project by Saraswathi Canal to stabilize the localized catchment area.

It has two major canals for water distribution, the Left canal length is 76.8 km and Right Canal length is about 8 km.

See also

 Nizamsagar
 Godavari River Basin Irrigation Projects
 Pranahita Chevella lift irrigation scheme
 Alisagar lift irrigation scheme
 Sripada Yellampalli project
 Lower Manair Dam
 Upper Manair Dam
 Icchampally Project

References

Reservoirs in Telangana
Dams on the Godavari River
Irrigation in Telangana